Engelbert Humperdinck is an album released in 1969 by Engelbert Humperdinck. It spent many weeks on the Billboard Top LPs chart in 1970. It contained the hits "I'm a Better Man" and "Winter World of Love".

Chart performance
After seven weeks on the Billboard albums chart, the album peaked at No. 5 on February 14, 1970.

Track listing

References

Engelbert Humperdinck albums
1969 albums
Decca Records albums
Albums produced by Peter Sullivan (record producer)